The Tackling Violent Crime Act is an omnibus statute that was given royal assent on February 28, 2008. The statute primarily deals with strengthening gun control in Canada as well as fighting drunk driving, drug-impaired driving and to increase the age of consent for sexual intercourse from 14 to 16.

References

2008 in Canadian politics
2008 in Canadian law
Canadian federal legislation
Canadian criminal law

Canadian firearms law